Paropta l-nigrum is a species of moth of the family Cossidae. It is found on Cyprus.

The wingspan is 36–39 mm. The forewings are ashen grey. The hindwings are uniform brownish grey.

References

Moths described in 1894
Cossinae